The 1996 CFL season is considered to be the 43rd season in modern-day Canadian football, although it is officially the 39th Canadian Football League season.

CFL News in 1996
At the CFL's Board of Governors Meetings in February 1996, it was decided to end the league's four-year American experiment.

The Shreveport Pirates had already disbanded; the league folded the Memphis Mad Dogs and rejected a sale and relocation plan that would have allowed the Birmingham Barracudas to move to Shreveport and survive, forcing that team's closure as well.  The Grey Cup champion Baltimore Stallions had opted to move elsewhere rather than face the daunting prospect of competing with the NFL's Baltimore Ravens.  When it was apparent the CFL was refocusing on Canada, Stallions owner Jim Speros gave up the Stallions franchise and moved his organisation to Montreal as the third incarnation of the Montreal Alouettes. Up until this time, the city of Montreal had been without Canadian football for nine seasons.  Speros revived the Als' traditional colour scheme of blue, white, and red.  Their logo was an angry bird running with a football; it was their helmet logo until 2019.  Unwilling to continue as the lone American team in the league, the San Antonio Texans voluntarily folded.

A dispersal draft was held for the players on four of the five American teams—all except the Stallions.  However, all of the Stallions players were released from their contracts.  Alouettes general manager Jim Popp, who followed the Stallions organisation to Montreal, managed to re-sign many of them; he was limited to half of the Alouettes roster, since the Stallions as an American team were not subject to the league's requirement that half of a team's roster comprise Canadian citizens, and the Alouettes would be subject to that rule. To stock the roster with Canadians, a special expansion draft, in which only the Canadian citizens on each other team's roster were subject, was held to stock the Alouettes' roster.

With the removal of the American teams, the CFL reverted to its traditional "East-West" alignment. The revived Alouettes were placed in the East Division and the Winnipeg Blue Bombers were placed back into the West Division, after 10 seasons.

The BC Lions and the Calgary Stampeders underwent ownership changes.

Regular season standings

Final regular season standings
Note: GP = Games Played, W = Wins, L = Losses, PF = Points For, PA = Points Against, Pts = Points

Bold text means that they have clinched the playoffs.
Calgary and Toronto both have first round byes.

Grey Cup playoffs

The Toronto Argonauts are the 1996 Grey Cup champions, defeating the Edmonton Eskimos 43–37, at Hamilton's Ivor Wynne Stadium.  The Argonauts' Doug Flutie (QB) was named the Grey Cup's Most Valuable Player and Mike Vanderjagt (K) was the Grey Cup's Most Valuable Canadian.

Playoff bracket

CFL Leaders
 CFL Passing Leaders
 CFL Rushing Leaders
 CFL Receiving Leaders

1996 CFL All-Stars

Offence
QB – Doug Flutie, Toronto Argonauts
FB – Robert Drummond, Toronto Argonauts
RB – Robert Mimbs, Saskatchewan Roughriders
SB – Michael Soles, Montreal Alouettes
SB – Darren Flutie, Edmonton Eskimos
WR – Joseph Rogers, Ottawa Rough Riders
WR – Eddie Brown, Edmonton Eskimos
C – Mike Kiselak, Toronto Argonauts
OG – Rocco Romano, Calgary Stampeders
OG – Leo Groenewegen, Edmonton Eskimos
OT – Chris Perez, Toronto Argonauts
OT – Fred Childress, Calgary Stampeders

Defence
DT – Rob Waldrop, Toronto Argonauts
DT – Bennie Goods, Edmonton Eskimos
DE – Malvin Hunter, Edmonton Eskimos
DE – Grant Carter, Montreal Alouettes
LB – Tracy Gravely, Montreal Alouettes
LB – Willie Pless, Edmonton Eskimos
LB – K. D. Williams, Winnipeg Blue Bombers
CB – Al Jordan, Calgary Stampeders
CB – Marvin Coleman, Calgary Stampeders
DB – Glenn Rogers Jr., Edmonton Eskimos
DB – Charles Gordon, Montreal Alouettes
DS – Trent Brown, Edmonton Eskimos

Special teams
P – Paul Osbaldiston, Hamilton Tiger-Cats
K – Mark McLoughlin, Calgary Stampeders
ST – Jimmy Cunningham, Toronto Argonauts

1996 Western All-Stars

Offence
QB – Jeff Garcia, Calgary Stampeders
FB – Sean Millington, BC Lions
RB – Robert Mimbs, Saskatchewan Roughriders
SB – Allen Pitts, Calgary Stampeders
SB – Darren Flutie, Edmonton Eskimos
WR – Terry Vaughn, Calgary Stampeders
WR – Eddie Brown, Edmonton Eskimos
C – Rod Connop, Edmonton Eskimos
OG – Rocco Romano, Calgary Stampeders
OG – Leo Groenewegen, Edmonton Eskimos
OT – Chris Walby, Winnipeg Blue Bombers
OT – Fred Childress, Calgary Stampeders

Defence
DT – Rodney Harding, Calgary Stampeders
DT – Bennie Goods, Edmonton Eskimos
DE – Malvin Hunter, Edmonton Eskimos
DE – Leroy Blugh, Edmonton Eskimos
LB – Angelo Snipes, Winnipeg Blue Bombers
LB – Willie Pless, Edmonton Eskimos
LB – K. D. Williams, Winnipeg Blue Bombers
CB – Al Jordan, Calgary Stampeders
CB – Marvin Coleman, Calgary Stampeders
DB – Glenn Rogers Jr., Edmonton Eskimos
DB – Andre Strode, BC Lions
DS – Trent Brown, Edmonton Eskimos

Special teams
P – Tony Martino, Calgary Stampeders
K – Mark McLoughlin, Calgary Stampeders
ST –Marvin Coleman, Calgary Stampeders

1996 Eastern All-Stars

Offence
QB – Doug Flutie, Toronto Argonauts
FB – Robert Drummond, Toronto Argonauts
RB – Mike Pringle, Montreal Alouettes
SB – Mac Cody, Hamilton Tiger-Cats
SB – Jock Climie, Montreal Alouettes
WR – Joseph Rogers, Ottawa Rough Riders
WR – Paul Masotti, Toronto Argonauts
C – Mike Kiselak, Toronto Argonauts
OG – Bruce Beaton, Montreal Alouettes
OG – Blaine Schmidt, Hamilton Tiger-Cats
OT – Chris Perez, Toronto Argonauts
OT – Neal Fort, Montreal Alouettes

Defence
DT – Rob Waldrop, Toronto Argonauts
DT – Mike Philbrick, Hamilton Tiger-Cats
DE – Reggie Givens, Toronto Argonauts
DE – Grant Carter, Montreal Alouettes
LB – Tracy Gravely, Montreal Alouettes
LB – Paul Randolph, Montreal Alouettes
LB – Lamar McGriggs, Ottawa Rough Riders
CB – Irvin Smith, Montreal Alouettes
CB – Adrion Smith, Toronto Argonauts
DB – Kenny Wilhite, Ottawa Rough Riders
DB – Charles Gordon, Montreal Alouettes
DS – Spencer McLennan, Montreal Alouettes

Special teams
P – Paul Osbaldiston, Hamilton Tiger-Cats
K – Terry Baker, Montreal Alouettes
ST – Jimmy Cunningham, Toronto Argonauts

1996 Intergold CFLPA All-Stars

Offence
QB – Doug Flutie, Toronto Argonauts
OT – Chris Perez, Toronto Argonauts
OT – Mark Dixon, Montreal Alouettes
OG – Rocco Romano, Calgary Stampeders
OG – Jamie Taras, BC Lions
C – Mike Kiselak, Toronto Argonauts
RB – Rob Mimbs, Saskatchewan Roughriders
FB – Tony Burse, Edmonton Eskimos
SB – Maclin Cody, Hamilton Tiger-Cats
SB – Darren Flutie, Edmonton Eskimos
WR – Curtis Mayfield, Saskatchewan Roughriders
WR – Terry Vaughn, Calgary Stampeders

Defence
DE – Grant Carter, Montreal Alouettes
DE – Leroy Blugh, Edmonton Eskimos
DT – John Kropke, Winnipeg Blue Bombers
DT – Rob Waldrop, Toronto Argonauts
OLB – Angelo Snipes, Winnipeg Blue Bombers
OLB – K. D. Williams, Winnipeg Blue Bombers
ILB – Willie Pless, Edmonton Eskimos
CB – Donald Smith, Toronto Argonauts
CB – Marvin Coleman, Calgary Stampeders
HB – Glenn Rogers Jr., Edmonton Eskimos
HB – Charles Gordon, Montreal Alouettes
S – Greg Knox, Calgary Stampeders

Special teams
K – Mark McLoughlin, Calgary Stampeders
P – Paul Osbaldiston, Hamilton Tiger-Cats
ST – Jimmy Cunningham, Toronto Argonauts

Head coach
 Don Matthews, Toronto Argonauts

1996 CFL Awards
CFL's Most Outstanding Player Award – Doug Flutie (QB), Toronto Argonauts
CFL's Most Outstanding Canadian Award – Leroy Blugh (DE), Edmonton Eskimos
CFL's Most Outstanding Defensive Player Award – Willie Pless (LB), Edmonton Eskimos
CFL's Most Outstanding Offensive Lineman Award – Mike Kiselak (C), Toronto Argonauts
CFL's Most Outstanding Rookie Award – Kelvin Anderson (RB), Calgary Stampeders
CFLPA's Outstanding Community Service Award – Mike "Pinball" Clemons (RB), Toronto Argonauts
CFL's Coach of the Year – Ron Lancaster, Edmonton Eskimos
Commissioner's Award - John Tory, Toronto

References

Further reading 
 

Canadian Football League seasons
CFL